This is a list of notable people born in, residents of, or otherwise closely associated with the city of St. Joseph, Missouri.

Don Alt (1916–1988), Iowa state representative and businessman; born in St. Joseph.
Charles S. L. Baker (1859–1926), African American businessman and inventor, lived in St. Joseph.
Kay Barnes (b. 1938), mayor of Kansas City 1999–2007
Dwayne Blakley (b. 1979), football player, born in St. Joseph.
Ryan Bradley (b. 1983), figure skater
Norbert Brodine, cinematographer
Byron Browne, baseball player
Charles Francis Buddy, bishop, attended Christian Brothers School
Rob Calloway, boxer
Harold F. Cherniss, historian of ancient Greece and Plato scholar at Princeton
Walter Cronkite, iconic television journalist, born in St. Joseph; his father was a dentist there
Paul Crouch, founder of Trinity Broadcasting Network
Katherine Kennicott Davis, composer of "The Little Drummer Boy"
Eminem, rapper and songwriter, born in St. Joseph
Eugene Field, popular poet in his day, worked for the St. Joseph Gazette and wrote a famous poem about Lover's Lane, St. Joseph
Harold K. Forsen, Nuclear physicist 
Ralph D. Foster, broadcasting pioneer
Betty Garrett, actress, known for On the Town and Laverne & Shirley, born in St. Joseph
Elijah Gates, State Treasurer of Missouri
Anthony Glise, guitarist
Jody Hamilton, wrestler
Larry Hamilton, wrestler
Fred Harman, artist, drew the Red Ryder cartoons and worked with Walt Disney, born in St. Joseph and worked at Artcrafts Engraving Company in St. Joseph
Coleman Hawkins, jazz saxophonist
Shere Hite, sex educator
Edie Huggins, television journalist
Bela M. Hughes (1817–1903), pioneer, born in Kentucky, was in the 1850s and 1860s a prominent St. Joseph lawyer
 William Hyde (1836–1898), journalist
 Lucie Fulton Isaacs, writer, philanthropist, suffragist
Jesse James, iconic outlaw, murdered in St. Joseph
Kagney Linn Karter, porn actress
Brian McDonald, writer 
Jeff Morris, actor, known for The Blues Brothers, born in St. Joseph
Timothy Omundson, actor
Mary Alicia Owen, Missouri folklorist
Isaac Parker, judge
Travis Partridge, football player
Forrest E. Peden, decorated World War II soldier
Tom Pendergast, political boss
Seraphine Eppstein Pisko, executive secretary of the Denver Jewish Hospital
Frank Posegate, mayor of St. Joseph
LeRoy Prinz, choreographer and film director
Arthur Pryor, trombonist
Randy Railsback, member of the Missouri House of Representatives
Sid Rogell, Hollywood producer
Nellie Tayloe Ross, first woman elected governor of a U.S. state; governor of Wyoming from 1925 to 1927
Martin Rucker, football player
Martin T. Rucker, politician
Mike Rucker, football player
Jay Sarno, hotel mogul, founder of Caesars Palace
Bill Snyder, Kansas State football coach
Eddie Timanus, Jeopardy! champion, won five times in 1999 despite being blind
Steve Walsh, musician of band Kansas
Ruth Warrick, actress, known for Citizen Kane and All My Children, born in St. Joseph
James H. Webb, U.S. Senator from Virginia, born in St. Joseph
Silas Woodson (1819–1896), 21st Governor of Missouri, born in Kentucky, was in the 19th century a prominent St. Joseph lawyer
Huston Wyeth, industrialist
Jane Wyman, Oscar–winning actress and first wife of Ronald Reagan, born in St. Joseph
Delmer J. Yoakum (1915–1996), artist
Olive Young, born in St. Joseph; actress and blues singer; was silent–films movie star in China but typecasting hurt her in Hollywood.
Orson L. Crandall, Naval Officer, Navy Master Diver, Medal of Honor recipient

References

St. Joseph
St. Joseph, Missouri